Allan Hansen (born 21 April 1956) is a Danish former football player who most notably played professionally for German team Hamburger SV, with whom he won the 1983 Bundesliga and European Cup trophies. He played 16 matches and scored three goals for the Denmark national football team, and was named 1977 and 1981 Danish Player of the Year.

Honours

Club 
 Bundesliga: 1982–83
 European Cup: 1982–83

Individual 
 Danish Player of the Year: 1977, 1981

References

External links 
 Allan Hansen at dbu.dk 
 
 

1956 births
Living people
Footballers from Odense
Association football midfielders
Association football forwards
Danish men's footballers
Odense Boldklub players
Tennis Borussia Berlin players
Hamburger SV players
Næstved Boldklub players
Bundesliga players
2. Bundesliga players
Denmark international footballers
Denmark under-21 international footballers
Members of the UEFA Executive Committee
Dalum IF players
Odense Kammeraternes Sportsklub players
Danish expatriate sportspeople in Germany
Danish expatriate men's footballers
Expatriate footballers in Germany